Cornhole (sometimes corn hole) is a sexual slang vulgarism for the anus. The term came into use in the 1910s in the United States. Its verb form, to cornhole, which came into use in the '30s, means 'to have anal sex'.

Connotations and variants

The term is apparently derived "from the practice in the days of the outhouse of using dried corn cobs for toilet paper."

By the middle of the 20th century, the term was used among American criminals. According to a 1944 report on male-male prison rape, the term had taken on a more specific meaning of taking the penetrative role in anal sex. It was also popularized in part through use in gay culture.

In a similar context, a corn husk is a "condom", especially one manufactured for anal intercourse.

According to linguist Jonathan Lighter, to cornhole and variant non-derived synonyms have developed as compound verbs: to corncob [1975] and to corndog [1985]. Linguists have noted the verb form as an example of possible compound verbs in English. There is debate whether such words are genuine compounds or pseudo-compounds.

Cornholio, the alter ego of Beavis from Beavis and Butt-head, is a play on the word cornhole, as his catch phrase is  “I am the Great Cornholio! I need TP for my bunghole!"<ref name="steinberg">Kellner, Douglas (2004). Beavis and Butt-Head: No Future for Postmodern Youth. In Steinberg, Shirley R.; Kincheloe, Joe. Kinderculture: The Corporate Construction Of Childhood. Westview Press, </ref> The personality of Cornholio, in turn, became inspiration for the cocktail called the "Flaming Cornholio".

Comedian George Carlin performed a short skit about the word cornhole in his 2005 show "Life Is Worth Losing", praising it for being tough-sounding and thus more honest than politically correct terms like anal intercourse or anal rape. He elaborated on the word repeatedly in earlier shows, including a famous rant about the euphemism treadmill which caused the term shell shock to evolve into post-traumatic stress disorder''. He then imagined its use in a forensic investigation scene of a police procedurals television series ("That there is a posthumous, multiple cornhole entry wound") and pointed out that "in prison it's a social activity".

See also

Asshole
Bunghole

References

Sexual slang
English profanity
English words
Anus